Progiraffa is an extinct genus of giraffid artiodactyls from the Early Miocene of Pakistan. It was first named by Pilgrim in 1908.It resembled more like a horse instead of an giraffe.It may have fed on vegetation found in its open-field habitat.

References

External links 
 Progiraffa at the Paleobiology Database

Prehistoric giraffes
Prehistoric even-toed ungulate genera
Miocene mammals of Asia
Fossil taxa described in 1908